Graham Thompson may refer to:

 Graham Thompson (footballer) (born 1936), Australian rules footballer
 Graham Thompson (swimmer) (born 1964), Zimbabwean swimmer